Senator Iglesias may refer to:

Roger Iglesias (born 1958), Senate of Puerto Rico
Santiago Iglesias (1872–1939), Senate of Puerto Rico